Catocala duplicata is a moth of the family Erebidae. It is found in Korea and Japan (Hokkaido, Honshu, Shikoku, and Kyushu).

The wingspan is about 47 mm.

References

External links
Catocala of Asia

duplicata
Moths of Asia
Moths described in 1885